This is a list of current heads of Tanzania Missions abroad.

Resident heads of mission

See also
List of diplomatic missions of Tanzania
Ministry of Foreign Affairs and International Co-operation (Tanzania)

References

 
heads of mission
Tanzania